Periploca longipenis is a moth in the family Cosmopterigidae. It was described by Bernard Landry in 2001. It is found on the Galápagos Islands.

References

Moths described in 2001
Chrysopeleiinae
Moths of South America